Carl Johan Erik "John" Jansson (18 July 1892 – 10 October 1943) was a Swedish diver, who competed at the 1912, 1920 and 1924 Summer Olympics.

In 1912 Olympics he won a bronze medal in the plain high diving event, was seventh in the 3 metre springboard, and was eliminated in the heats of 10 metre platform event. Eight years later he won a bronze medal in the plain high diving event and was sixth in the 3 metre springboard. In 1924 he won a silver medal in the plain high diving event.

References

1892 births
1943 deaths
Swedish male divers
Olympic divers of Sweden
Divers at the 1912 Summer Olympics
Divers at the 1920 Summer Olympics
Divers at the 1924 Summer Olympics
Olympic silver medalists for Sweden
Olympic bronze medalists for Sweden
Olympic medalists in diving
Medalists at the 1924 Summer Olympics
Medalists at the 1920 Summer Olympics
Medalists at the 1912 Summer Olympics
Stockholms KK divers
Divers from Stockholm
19th-century Swedish people
20th-century Swedish people